Björn Gunnar Ingelman (born 1952), is a Swedish physicist working as a professor of theoretical particle physics at Uppsala University, who is also the secretary of the Nobel Committee for Physics.

Life
Ingelman received his PhD in theoretical physics in 1982 at Lund University. His supervisors were Bo Andersson and Gösta Gustafson. His opponent was Frank Close. Ingelman created and leads the Theoretical High Energy Physics group at Uppsala University.
Gunnar Ingelman is also a member of the Royal Swedish Academy of Sciences at physics class.

References 

Swedish physicists
Academic staff of Uppsala University
Members of the Royal Swedish Academy of Sciences
1952 births
Living people
Lund University alumni
Particle physicists
Date of birth missing (living people)
Place of birth missing (living people)
Theoretical physicists